Ganganagar Lok Sabha constituency is one of the 25 Lok Sabha (parliamentary) constituencies in Rajasthan state in India.

Assembly segments
Presently, Ganganagar Lok Sabha constituency comprises eight Vidhan Sabha (legislative assembly) segments. These are:

Members of Parliament
1952: Pannalal Barupal, Indian National Congress
1957: Pannalal Barupal, Indian National Congress
1962: Pannalal Barupal, Indian National Congress
1967: Pannalal Barupal, Indian National Congress
1971: Pannalal Barupal, Indian National Congress
1977: Bega Ram, Janata Party
1980: Birbal Ram, Indian National Congress
1984: Birbal Ram, Indian National Congress
1989: Begaram Chauhan, Janata Dal
1991: Birbal Ram, Indian National Congress
1996: Nihalchand Meghwal, Bharatiya Janata Party
1998: Shankar Pannu, Indian National Congress
1999: Nihalchand Meghwal, Bharatiya Janata Party
2004: Nihalchand Meghwal, Bharatiya Janata Party
2009: Bharat Ram Meghwal, Indian National Congress
2014: Nihalchand Meghwal, Bharatiya Janata Party
2019: Nihalchand Meghwal, Bharatiya Janata Party

Election results

2019 Lok Sabha

2014 Lok Sabha

2009 Lok Sabha

2004 Lok Sabha

See also
 Sri Ganganagar
 List of Constituencies of the Lok Sabha

Notes

External links
Ganganagar lok sabha  constituency election 2019 result details

Lok Sabha constituencies in Rajasthan
Sri Ganganagar district
Sri Ganganagar